Junqan District is in Farsan County, Chaharmahal and Bakhtiari province, Iran. At the 2006 census, its population (as Mizdej-e Sofla Rural District and the city of Junqan within the Central District) was 38,604 in 8,795 households. The following census in 2011 counted 35,166 people in 9,487 households, by which time those parts had become established as Junqan District with two rural districts and two cities. At the latest census in 2016, the district had 34,876 inhabitants living in 9,944 households.

References 

Farsan County

Districts of Chaharmahal and Bakhtiari Province

Populated places in Chaharmahal and Bakhtiari Province

Populated places in Farsan County

fa:بخش جونقان